Desmond Niland (8 November 1912 – 15 January 1978) was a South African cricketer. He played in fourteen first-class matches for Border and Eastern Province from 1934/35 to 1947/48.

See also
 List of Border representative cricketers

References

External links
 

1912 births
1978 deaths
South African cricketers
Border cricketers
Eastern Province cricketers